Daan Disveld (born 20 January 1994) is a Dutch footballer playing as a right back for DOVO in the Dutch Derde Divisie.

Club career
He joined the youth academy of NEC when he was 5 years old. He was given a 2-year professional contract in April 2011. On 18 January 2013, he extended his contract till 2015. In December 2013, he was included in the squad for a league match against Groningen. He then finally made his debut against the club. Disveld played his second match for NEC in a KNVB Cup match against the same team, but this time NEC lost 5–2. After his expiring contract had not been extended, Disveld signed for two years with Eerste Divisie side FC Den Bosch.

International career
He was the captain of the Netherlands U17 team which won the 2011 UEFA European Under-17 Championship after a 5–2 win over Germany U17. Disveld was also included in the Netherlands U19 for UEFA European Under-19 Championship qualifiers in Poland.

Honours

Club
NEC
Eerste Divisie (1): 2014–15

Country
 UEFA European Under-17 Championship (1): 2011

References

External links
 Voetbal International profile 

1994 births
Living people
Association football defenders
Dutch footballers
NEC Nijmegen players
FC Den Bosch players
Eredivisie players
Eerste Divisie players
Tweede Divisie players
Derde Divisie players
Netherlands youth international footballers
Footballers from Nijmegen
SV TEC players